Melvin is a former unincorporated community in Fresno County, California, now incorporated into Clovis. It lies at an elevation of 358 feet (109 m).

References

Neighborhoods in Fresno County, California